Alquimia (sometimes credited as Alquimia la Sonora del XXI or, less often, Alquimia la Sonora del 21) is a Colombian salsa music band, originally a trio with female singer. They were nominated for best salsa album at Premio Lo Nuestro 1999.

Discography
 Nuestro Tiempo

References

Colombian salsa musical groups